Buddy is a 2013 Indian Malayalam film written and directed by Raaj Prabavthy Menon. The film has been produced by Augustin Jackson and it features Anoop Menon and Honey Rose. Balachandra Menon made a comeback after a long time through this film. The film did fairly well at the box office.

Plot
The story commence from the house of Vishnu, a 17-year-old who is raised by two mothers Meenakshi, a renowned writer and Padma, a researcher in Bharatnatyam art form. They are born feminists and strong willed women who decide to have a child through artificial insemination and thus Vishnu happens to them. The story features the friendship between a father and son. Maanikunju was living his dream when the 17-year-old Vishnu walked into their life. With some hidden intentions, Vishnu befriends Maanikunju and his friends. But the nature of his father leaves him surprised. Another person Shankaran Nampoothirippad acts as a tool between the two. What follows next forms the rest of the story.

Cast
 Anoop Menon as Krishnadashian
 Srikanth as Neil Fernandez
 Mithun Murali as Vishnu
 Bhumika Chawla as Ahaana
 Honey Rose as Diya 
 Asha Sarath as Ishaani
 Balachandra Menon as Shankaran Namboothiri/Shanku Bhai
 Babu Antony as Chandran Singh
 Lal as Michael Dominic Savio
 T. G. Ravi as Chandikunju
 Aju Varghese as Rahul Kulkarni
 Josutty as Kurisu
 Neeraj Madhav as Govindh
 Anil Murali as Binoy Mammen
 Arun Midhun as Biju Pattambi
 Lakshmipriya as Hansika
 Sreedevi Unni as Sindhu
 Swarna Thomas as Ahadishika

Soundtrack

References

External links
 

2013 films
2010s Malayalam-language films